The River (French: Le Fleuve) is a 1951 American Technicolor drama romance film directed by Jean Renoir shot in Calcutta, India where the Indian filmmaker Satyajit Ray, then a student of cinema met him for guidance. It was fully filmed in India.

A fairly faithful dramatization of the 1946 novel of the same name by Rumer Godden, the film narrative follows a teenager's coming of age and first love, with the namesake river as a central theme and backdrop.

The film was produced by Kenneth McEldowney, and original music was by M. A. Partha Sarathy. The cast includes Esmond Knight, Nora Swinburne and Arthur Shields.

Plot 

Harriet (Patricia Walters) is a teenaged girl who belongs to an upper middle-class English family residing on the banks of the Ganges River in British India. Her father (Esmond Knight) runs a jute mill, and she has four sisters and one brother, all several years younger than her. They are raised in a genteel, English setting, and even have the benefit of live-in Indian employees, such as a nanny.

The normal order of Harriet's life is shaken when the family's neighbor invites his cousin, Captain John (Thomas E. Breen), to live with him on his plantation. When Captain John arrives, the children discover he has lost one leg in the war. Harriet, her sisters, and Harriet's best friend Valerie (Adrienne Corri) are all smitten with him and therefore invite him to a Diwali celebration. Harriet also gains the courage to show him her "secret book" - her diary. He politely acquiesces in a non-romantic way.

Later, eager to impress upon him her familiarity with Hindu religion, or perhaps to divert his attention from Valerie, Harriet tells him a marriage story where mundane identities of ordinary peasants are subject to divine change and transformation. In this tale, Lord Krishna intervenes in a wedding ceremony to assume the identity of the groom, and a bride is temporarily transformed into Krishna's consort. There follows an extended dance sequence with Radha Burnier performing as Krishna's consort. After Harriet's story, Valerie steals the diary and reads lovelorn passages of it aloud in front of Captain John, embarrassing Harriet greatly.

Harriet's brother develops an obsession with cobras after watching a snake charmer one day in the market. Happening across the boy playing a flute to a cobra in their garden one day, Harriet commands him to inform their parents of the dangerous snake's presence. She does not tell them herself after becoming distracted by an opportunity to eavesdrop on Captain John and Valerie. Harriet follows them to a point on the river bank where, believing they are alone, Captain John trades a passionate kiss with Valerie. Harriet's brother's body is found soon after, killed by the cobra. Overcome with jealousy and wracked with guilt over the boy's death, Harriet loses the will to live.

She runs away from home that night and attempts to commit suicide by floating down the river in an unattended canoe-like skiff, the river being dangerous to navigate at night due to strong currents. However her late brother's friend Kanu sees her steal the boat and local fishermen rescue her from the water. Ashore, she refuses transport back to her family. Captain John, sent by Kanu, arrives, eases her mind, and kisses her on the forehead to her delight. She then allows him to take her home.

It is revealed subsequently that Captain John also has an interest in Melanie (Radha Burnier), the twenty-ish, biracial daughter from his cousin's marriage to a now-deceased Indian woman. Captain John and Melanie compare their experiences struggling with wartime injury and being biracial respectively.

The story ends with Harriet's mother giving birth to another baby girl. Prevented from entering the room just after labor is completed, Harriet, Valerie and Melanie pause for a moment in front of the river to reflect on the cycles of life and death that take place on its banks.

Cast
 Nora Swinburne as The Mother 
 Esmond Knight as The Father 
 Arthur Shields as Mr. John 
 Suprova Mukerjee as Nan 
 Thomas E. Breen as Capt. John 
 Patricia Walters as Harriet 
 Radha Burnier as Melanie 
 Adrienne Corri as Valerie 
 June Hillman as Narrator

Production 
Shot in Technicolor, a five-month turnaround at the lab meant things had to be done right the first time. While filming, Renoir made use of nonprofessional actors in key roles, including Captain John and Harriet. The future Indian film maker Satyajit Ray, then working in advertising, met Renoir while The River was in production, and the two men became close. Ray met Subrata Mitra, a production assistant on this film and Ray's eventual cinematographer, during filming.

Assistant director was Harisadhan Dasgupta and Asst. Art director was Bangshi Chandra Gupta

Thomas E. Breen, playing Captain John, was a veteran of the United States Marine Corps who was injured during fighting on Guam in 1944, resulting in amputation of his right leg. Renoir selected him for the role without knowing that he was the son of Joseph Breen, head of the Motion Picture Producers and Distributors of America, who was the chief censor of films in the U.S.

Awards, responses and preservation
At the Venice Film Festival, the film won the International Award in 1951. The National Board of Review in the United States decided that it was among the Top Five Foreign Films for 1951.

Roger Ebert added The River to his "Great Movies" list in 2006.

The River was preserved by the Academy Film Archive, in conjunction with the British Film Institute in 2004.

Influence
At the New York Film Festival, director Wes Anderson, a great fan of Jean Renoir, discussed Martin Scorsese's having shown him a print of The River; it is one of Scorsese's favourite films. The River was hugely influential upon Wes Anderson's film, The Darjeeling Limited (2007), as it inspired Anderson to make a film about India.

Notes

References

External links
 
 
 
The River: A New Authenticity an essay by Ian Christie at the Criterion Collection
 The River in Cine y Revolución 

1951 films
1951 romantic drama films
Films based on British novels
Films based on works by Rumer Godden
Films directed by Jean Renoir
Films set in India
Films set in the British Empire
Films shot in India
French coming-of-age films
1950s French-language films
French romantic drama films
1950s French films